The groat is the traditional name of a defunct English and Irish silver coin worth four pence, and also a Scottish coin which was originally worth fourpence, with later issues being valued at eightpence and one shilling.

Name
The name has also been applied to any thick or large coin, such as the Groschen (grosso), a silver coin issued by Tyrol in 1271 and Venice in the 13th century, which was the first of this general size to circulate in the Holy Roman Empire and other parts of Europe. The immediate ancestor to the groat was the French gros tournois or groat of Tours, which was known as the groot (Dutch for "great" or "large") in the Netherlands.

The name also refers to a range of other European coins such as those of the Italian peninsula known as a grosso including the grosso of Venice and the Kraków grosz in Poland. Marco Polo referred to the groat in recounts of his travels to East Asia when describing the currencies of the Yuan Empire. His descriptions were based on the conversion of 1 bezant = 20 groats =  tornesel.

History

It was after the French silver coin had circulated in England that an English groat was first minted under King Edward I.

Scottish groats were not issued until the reign of David II. Scots groats were originally also worth fourpence, but later issues were valued at eightpence and a shilling.

Irish groats were minted first in 1425 and the last ones were minted under the reign of Elizabeth I of England. There were also two more issues, both emergency coinage.

English groat or fourpence therefore contained  of sterling silver. From 1544 to 1560 (the weight being reduced to 32 grains (2.1 g) in 1559) the silver fineness was less than sterling, and after the 1561 issue they were not generally issued for circulation again for about a hundred years.

From the reigns of Charles II to George III, groats (by now often known as fourpences) were issued on an irregular basis for general circulation, the only years of mintage after 1786 being in 1792, 1795, and 1800. After this the only circulating issues were from 1836 to 1855, with proofs known from 1857 and 1862, and a colonial issue of 1888. These last coins had the weight further reduced to about 27 grains (1.9 grams) and were the same diameter as the silver threepenny pieces of the day although thicker. They also had Britannia on the reverse, while all other silver fourpenny pieces since the reign of William and Mary have had a crowned numeral "4" as the reverse, including the silver fourpenny Maundy money coins of the present. Some groats continued to circulate in Scotland until the 20th century.

At times in the past, silver twopenny coins have been called "half-groats".

The groat ceased to be minted in the United Kingdom in 1856, but in 1888 a special request was made for a colonial variety to be minted for use in British Guiana and the British West Indies. The groat remained in circulation in British Guiana right up until that territory adopted the decimal system in 1955.

Groats are still issued in sets of Maundy Coinage.

Royal Navy chaplains
In the 1600s and 1700s, chaplains were employed in English Navy ships of war by the captain, and paid out of a groat per month deducted from the wages of the seamen. The Navy's wages did not rise between 1653 and 1797 (see Spithead and Nore mutinies), during which time the ordinary seaman was paid 19 shillings, as was the chaplain.

Cultural references
The word "groat" has entered into a number of English and Scottish expressions, many of them now archaic.

In the north of England, there is the saying "Blood without groats is nothing"  meaning "family without fortune is worthless." The allusion is to black pudding, which consists chiefly of blood and oats formed into a sausage and cut into slices. "Not worth a groat" is an old saying meaning "not worth a penny", i.e. worthless.

Benjamin Franklin, in his book, Necessary Hints gives the following thrifty advice:

Beatrix Potter's The Tale of Squirrel Nutkin features the following riddle:

The answer is "a cherry".

In The Graveyard Book by Neil Gaiman, a character recounts the paying of groats to people who held her underwater to determine if she was a witch:

According to Hawkins' History of the Silver Coins of England, groats were also known as "Joeys",

This refers to the Victorian fourpenny piece.  The mention of cab fares is related to the fact that the standard minimum was fourpence, so many passengers paid with a sixpenny piece, allowing the cabbie to keep the twopence change as a tip. The slang name "Joey" was transferred to the silver threepenny pieces in use in the first third of the twentieth century.

In A Little Princess by Frances Hodgson Burnett, Sara Crewe picks up a fourpenny piece from the street and uses it to buy buns. The original story was set in 1888.

John o' Groats, a place name in the north of Scotland, is not derived from "groat" but is a corruption of "Jan de Groot", the name of a Dutchman who migrated there in the reign of James IV.

See also

 British coinage
 Scottish coinage
 Lee Penny (talisman)

Notes

References
 Brewer's Dictionary of Phrase and Fable (1898)
 
 James Mackay - John Mussel (eds.): Coin Price Guide to British coins, Token Publishing Ltd, Axminster, Devon
 Ian Halley Stewart. The Scottish Coinage, Spink & Son, Londra, 1955

External links

 

Coins of England
Coins of Scotland
Coins of Great Britain
Coins of Ireland